Alannah Yip (born October 26, 1993) is a Canadian sport climber. She was national champion in her age category when she was twelve. She won a gold medal at the American Climbing Championships 2020 in Los Angeles, which qualified her for the 2020 Summer Olympics in Tokyo.

Life
Yip was born and raised in North Vancouver. She began climbing when she was nine when her godparent's children became interested in climbing. She won her first National Climbing Championship when she was twelve. She trained to be an engineer, specialising in mechatronics. She tried giving up climbing to concentrate on her university studies, but she realised that sport was essential. In 2015 she was able to visit Switzerland as part of her studies and she was able to practice climbing in her spare time with the Swiss national team. When she returned to Canada she began training with the "Climb Base 5" in preparation for the following years World Cup climbing events.

Yip graduated with a Bachelor of Applied Science in mechanical engineering from the University of British Columbia in 2018.

Her coach was Andrew Wilson in 2018 and she has been supported by Petro-Canada. She qualified for a place in sport climbing at the 2020 Summer Olympics by winning the 2020 IFSC Pan-American Championships.

Results

World championships

Pan American championships

References

1993 births
Living people
People from North Vancouver
Canadian engineers
Canadian rock climbers
Sport climbers at the 2020 Summer Olympics
Olympic sport climbers of Canada